A manastambha (Sanskrit for 'column of honour') is a pillar that is often constructed in front of Jain temples or large Jain statues. In North India, they are topped by four Tirthankara images.

According to the Digambara Jain texts like Adi Purana and Tiloyapannati, a huge manastambha stands in front of the samavasarana (divine preaching hall) of the tirthankaras, which causes someone entering a samavasarana to shed their pride.

A monolithic manastambha is a standard feature in the Jain temples of Moodabidri. They include a statue of Brahmadeva on the top as a guardian yaksha.

Examples
Some of the well known Jain manastambhas are:

 Kirti Stambha of Chittorgarh. The Vijaya Stambha was inspired by this.
 Manastambhas of Devagarh
 Manastambhas of Moodabidri
 Manastambhas of Shravanabelagola
 Manastambha at Shikharji at Madhuvan

Manastambhas in South India are generally monolithic.

Photo gallery

See also

Jain Temples
Tirthas

References

Citations

Sources

External links
 Chittor and its Kirti Stambha
 Jaina Architecture in Northern India

Jain architecture
Monumental columns in India